Katherine "Kathy" Lawrence (December 11, 1954 – March 25, 2004) was a television series screenwriter and a short story science fiction and children's non-fiction educational books and video game writer.

Biography
Lawrence was born Katherine Selbert on December 11, 1954. She chose her writing name because of her love for T. E. Lawrence and Jerome Lawrence. She received her Bachelor of Arts degree in the English language from the University of Washington in Seattle and suffered from chronic fatigue syndrome. In 1996, she was nominated for Outstanding Script by the Writers Guild of America for "Icebound", an episode of Hypernauts, a live-action science fiction series.

On March 27, 2004, her body was found at San Pedro River in Arizona, along with a suicide note. Lawrence was 49 years old, and her death was apparently caused by a self-inflicted gunshot wound. Her ashes were spread over Mount Lemmon, which was her favorite area.

Writing credits

Television
Dungeons & Dragons (1985)
MoonDreamers (1986)
Bionic Six (1987)
Muppet Babies (1987)
Beetlejuice (1991)
Conan the Adventurer (1992-1993)
Biker Mice from Mars (1994)
Mighty Max (1994)
Darkstalkers (1995)
G.I. Joe Extreme (1996)
Hypernauts (1996)
Princess Gwenevere and the Jewel Riders (1996)
ReBoot (1998)
Shadow Raiders (1998)
Roswell Conspiracies: Aliens, Myths and Legends (1999)
Kong: The Animated Series (2000)
X-Men: Evolution (2000)
Stargate Infinity (2002-2003)
Legend of the Dragon (2006)

Film
The Secret of Mulan (1998)

Video games
Mario is Missing! (1993)
Inherit the Earth: Quest for the Orb (1994)
This Means War! (1995)
Battle Vision (1997)

References

External links

Katherine Lawrence memorial website

1954 births
2004 suicides
People with chronic fatigue syndrome
American children's writers
American education writers
American fantasy writers
American science fiction writers
American television writers
Suicides by firearm in Arizona
University of Washington alumni
Video game writers
American women novelists
20th-century American novelists
20th-century American women writers
Women science fiction and fantasy writers
20th-century American short story writers
American women non-fiction writers
American women television writers
20th-century American screenwriters
Suicides by drowning in the United States
21st-century American women
Women in the video game industry